Poteranthera is a genus of flowering plants belonging to the family Melastomataceae.

Its native range is Southern Tropical America.

Species:

Poteranthera annectans 
Poteranthera leptalea 
Poteranthera pusilla 
Poteranthera warmingii 
Poteranthera windischii

References

Melastomataceae
Melastomataceae genera